This is a list of topics related to Laos.  This is so that those interested in the subject can monitor changes to the pages by clicking on Recent changes in the sidebar.

The list is not necessarily complete or up to date - if you see an article that should be here but is not (or one that should not be here but is), please do update the page accordingly.

Since the page is a maintenance page, the interested parties also want to know when changes are made to this list as well; so please do not remove the self-link.

Laos
 Laos
 Military of Laos
 International Agreement on the Neutrality of Laos
 Talat Sao

Buildings and structures in Laos

Overview
Laos Cultural Profile (Ministry of Information and Culture/Visiting Arts)

Specific buildings and structures

 Patuxay
 Pha That Luang
 Reservoirs and dams in Laos
 Xieng Keo

Airports in Laos
 Luang Prabang International Airport
 Savannakhet Airport
 Wattay International Airport

Archaeological sites in Laos
 Plain of Jars

Bridges in Laos
 Thai–Lao Friendship Bridge
 Second Thai-Lao Friendship Bridge
 Third Thai-Lao Friendship Bridge

Dams in Laos
 Nam Theun II

Houses in Laos

Royal residences in Laos
 Royal Palace Museum

Libraries in Laos 
 National Library of Laos
 Digital Library of Lao Manuscripts

Museums in Laos
 List of museums in Laos
 Royal Palace Museum

Places of worship in Laos

Buddhist temples in Laos
 Wat Manorom
 Pha That Luang
 Wat Phou
 Wat Si Saket
 Wat Xieng Thong

Hindu temples in Laos
 Wat Phou

World Heritage Sites in Laos
 Luang Prabang
 Wat Phou

Cities in Laos
 List of cities in Laos
 Ban Houayxay
 Champasak (town)
 Louang Namtha
 Luang Prabang
 Muang Xay
 Pakse
 Phongsali
 Phonsavan
 Sainyabuli
 Salavan (city)
 Savannakhet (city)
 Thakhek
 Vang Vieng
 Vientiane
 Xam Neua

Communications in Laos
 Communications in Laos
 .la

Conservation in Laos

Laotian culture
 Culture of Laos
 Coat of arms of Laos
 Cuisine of Laos
 Dance and theater of Laos
 Festivals of Laos
 Flag of Laos
 Lao alphabet
 Pheng Xat Lao
 Phra Lak Phra Lam
 Saksit
 Scouting in Laos
 Vixakha Bouxa

Laotian art
 Lao ceramics
 Laotian art
 Lao Buddhist sculpture

Lao cuisine
 Beerlao
 Cuisine of Laos
 Glutinous rice
 Kaffir lime
 Larb
 Padek
 Tam mark hung

Languages of Laos
 Bahnaric languages
 Halang language
 Hmong language
 Katuic languages
 Khmu language
 Kuy language
 Lao French
 Lao language
 Mlabri
 Northern Thai language
 Romanization of Lao
 Saek language
 Sedang language
 Tai Dam language
 Tai Lü language
 Tua Tham

Laotian music
 Khene
 Lao music
 Music of Laos

Lam
 Banyen Rakgan
 Christy Gibson
 Jintara Poonlarp
 Khene
 Mor lam
 Mor lam sing
 Siriporn Ampaipong

Laotian musicians

Laotian writers
 Douangdeuane Viravongs
 Outhine Bounyavong
 Thavisouk Phrasavath
 Ova Saopeng
 Bryan Thao Worra
 Catzie Vilayphonh
 Saymoukda Vongsay

Economy of Laos
 Economy of Laos
 Lao kip

Companies of Laos
 Lao Brewery Company

Trade unions of Laos
 Lao Federation of Trade Unions

Education in Laos

Schools in Laos
 Vientiane International School
 Sharon English School
 The Sai Nyai Eco-School

Universities and colleges in Laos
 National University of Laos
 Sisavangvong University
 Soutsaka College of Management and Technology
  University of Health Sciences

Environment of Laos
 National Biodiversity Conservation Areas

Fauna of Laos

Geography of Laos
 Geography of Laos
 Demographics of Laos
 ISO 3166-2:LA
 Khong Island
 Reservoirs and dams in Laos
 Xiangkhoang Plateau

Caves of Laos
 Pak Ou Caves
 Viengxay caves

Maps of Laos
 Maps of Laos

Old maps of Laos
 Maps of Laos

Mountains of Laos
 Phou Bia

Rivers of Laos
 Ca River
 Kong River
 Ma River
 Mekong
 Nam Ou
 Nam Song River
 Tha River

Villages in Laos
 Pakbeng

Waterfalls of Laos
 Khone Falls

Government of Laos
 Foreign relations of Laos
 Human rights in Laos
 Ministry of Security
 National Assembly of Laos
 Prime Minister of Laos

Health in Laos
 Health in Laos

History of Laos
 History of Laos
 History of Laos since 1945
 History of Laos to 1945
 Fa Khai
 Fa Ngum
 First Indochina War
 French colonial administration of Laos
 Haw wars
 Khamtum
 Kings of Luang Prabang
 Kong Le
 Laasaenthai Bouvanaat
 Lan Kham Deng
 Lan Xang
 List of Kings of Lan Xang
 Meunsai
 Ming Shi-lu
 Muang Sua
 Na Champassak
 Pathet Lao
 Phommathat
 Photisarath
 Royal Lao Air Force
 Royal Palace Museum
 Samsenethai
 Laotian Civil War the Secret War
 Setthathirath
 Sompou
 Sourigna Vongsa
 Sri Sattanak
 Vang Tao Incident
 Vientiane Treaty
 Visunarat

Elections in Laos
 Elections in Laos

Governors-General of French Indochina
 Governor-General of French Indochina
 Paul Bert
 Georges Catroux
 Jean Antoine Ernest Constans
 Jean Decoux
 Paul Doumer
 Albert Sarraut
 Joost van Vollenhoven

Laotian law

Law enforcement in Laos
 Ministry of Security

Laos-related lists
 List of Laos-related topics
 President of Laos
 Prime Minister of Laos

Disappeared People in Laos
 Eugene DeBruin

Laotian media

Newspapers published in Laos
 List of newspapers in Laos
 Le Rénovateur
 Vientiane Times

Military of Laos
 Military of Laos
 Royal Lao Army
 Royal Lao Air Force

Laotian people
 Anouvong
 Boun Oum
 Bounkhong
 Fa Khai
 Fa Ngum
 Khamphoui
 Khamtum
 Khun Borom
 Khun Lo
 Kouprasith Abhay
 Laasaenthai Bouvanaat
 Lan Kham Deng
 Lee Lue
 Mangkra Souvannaphouma
 Meunsai
 Na Champassak
 Phoumi Nosavan
 Pa Kao Her
 Phetsarath Rattanavongsa
 Phommathat
 Photisarath
 Ratsadanay
 Samsenethai
 Sauryavong Savang
 Savang Vatthana
 Bounleut Saycocie
 Siluck Saysanasy
 Setthathirath
 Sisavang Vong
 Sompou
 Soulivong Savang
 Sourigna Vongsa
 Souvannarath
 Thao Ma
 Thayavong Savang
 Three Princes
 Visunarat
 Vong Savang
 Vilayphone Vongphachanh

Lao Monarchy
 Boun Oum
 Bounkhong
 Khamphoui
 Mangkra Souvannaphouma
 Phetsarath Rattanavongsa
 Ratsadanay
 Sauryavong Savang
 Soulivong Savang
 Souphanouvong
 Souvanna Phouma
 Souvannarath
 Thayavong Savang
 Savang Vatthana
 Vong Savang

Laotian Americans
 List of Laotian Americans
 TC Huo
 Kay Sivilay
 Bryan Thao Worra
 Vang Pao

People of Laotian descent

Laotian Australians
 Kaz Patafta

Laotian politicians
 Souvanna Phouma
 Zong Zoua Her

Lao People's Revolutionary Party members
 Bouasone Bouphavanh
 Bounnhang Vorachith
 General Cheng
 Choummaly Sayasone
 Kaysone Phomvihane
 Khamtai Siphandon
 Nouhak Phoumsavanh
 Somsavat Lengsavad
 Souphanouvong
 Soutchay Thammasith
 Thongloun Sisoulith
 Phoumi Vongvichit

Hill people
 Hill people SECTION South-East Asia
 Ong Keo
 Ong Kommandam
 Khom script (Ong Kommadam)

Hmong people
 Lee Lue
 Pa Chay Vue
 Vang Pao
 Vang Seu

Hmong Americans
 Hmong American
 List of Hmong Americans
 Dia Cha
 Mee Moua
 Brenda Song
 Vang Pao
 Chai Vang

Hmong writers
 Dia Cha
 Gary Yia Lee
 Shoua Lee
 Mai Neng Moua
 Pacyinz Lyfoung
 Ka Vang
 May Lee Yang

Khmuic peoples

Politics of Laos
 Politics of Laos
 Committee for Independence and Democracy in Laos
 Foreign relations of Laos
 Human rights in Laos
 National Assembly of Laos
 President of Laos

Political parties in Laos
 List of political parties in Laos
 Lao People's Revolutionary Party

Provinces of Laos

 Provinces of Laos
 Attapu Province
 Bokeo Province
 Bolikhamxai
 Champasak Province
 Houaphan
 Khammouan
 Louang Namtha Province
 Louangphabang Province
 Oudomxai Province
 Phongsali Province
 Salavan Province
 Savannakhet Province
 Template:Laos provinces
 Vientiane (prefecture)
 Vientiane Province
 Wikipedia:WikiProject Countries/Templates/Navboxes
 Xaignabouli Province
 Xaisomboun
 Xekong Province
 Xiangkhoang Province

Religion in Laos
 Buddhism in Laos
 Mission évangélique au Laos
 Phra Bang
 Protestants in Laos
 Roman Catholicism in Laos

Roman Catholic dioceses in Laos
 Vicariate Apostolic of Luang Prabang
 Vicariate Apostolic of Paksé
 Vicariate Apostolic of Savannakhet

Laotian society
 Demographics of Laos
 Human rights in Laos
 Laotian American
 Scouting in Laos

Ethnic groups in Laos
 List of ethnic groups in Laos
 Dai people
 Hmong people
 Katang
 Khmu people
 Lao Lum
 Lao Sung
 Lao Theung
 Lao people
 Mlabri
 Mon people
 Si La

Sport in Laos

Laotian athletes
 Chamleunesouk Ao Oudomphonh

Football in Laos
 Lao Football Federation
 Laos national football team
 Laos national under-17 football team
 Laos national under-23 football team

Football venues in Laos
 New Laos National Stadium
 Chao Anouvong Stadium
 Attapeu Stadium
 Luang Prabang Stadium
 Champasak Stadium
 Lao-American College FC Stadium
 Savannakhet Stadium

Laos at the Olympics
 Laos at the 1980 Summer Olympics
 Laos at the 1996 Summer Olympics
 Laos at the 2000 Summer Olympics
 Laos at the 2004 Summer Olympics

Tourism in Laos
 Tourism in Laos

Airlines of Laos
 Lao Airlines

Visitor attractions in Laos

Transportation in Laos
 Transportation in Laos

Roads in Laos
 Kunming-Bangkok Expressway

Laos stubs

See also
Lists of country-related topics - similar lists for other countries

Notes
Most of the articles in :Category:Articles needing Thai script or text actually need Lao-language help